Silver Lake is a small lake on Manitoulin Island, in Lake Huron, Northern Ontario, Canada.

See also
Manitoulin Island
List of lakes in Ontario

References 

Lakes of Ontario